The Shroud of Turin, also known as the Holy Shroud (  or ), is a length of linen cloth bearing the negative image of a man. Some describe the image as depicting Jesus of Nazareth and believe the fabric is the burial shroud in which he was wrapped after crucifixion. The image on the shroud is much clearer in a black and white photographic negative—first observed in 1898 by photographer Secondo Pia—than in its natural sepia color.

First mentioned in 1354, the shroud was denounced in 1389 by the local bishop of Troyes as a fake. Currently the Catholic Church neither formally endorses nor rejects the shroud, and in 2013 Pope Francis referred to it as an "icon of a man scourged and crucified". The shroud has been kept in the royal chapel of the Cathedral of Turin, in northern Italy, since 1578.

In 1988, radiocarbon dating by three different laboratories established that the shroud material was from the Middle Ages, between the years 1260 and 1390. This test has sparked a debate of its own, with some scholars questioning the test result on the basis that the sample tested may have been contaminated or may have been taken from a strip of the shroud that was added later. All of these fringe hypotheses have been scientifically refuted, by carbon-dating experts and others using actual evidence from the shroud itself, including the medieval repair hypothesis, the bio-contamination hypothesis and the carbon monoxide hypothesis. The dating of the shroud nonetheless continues to be questioned by some people.

A variety of methods have been proposed for the formation of the image, but the actual method used has not yet been conclusively identified. The shroud continues to be intensely studied, and remains a controversial issue among some scientists and biblical scholars.

Description

The cloth is woven in a three-to-one herringbone twill composed of flax fibrils. Its most distinctive characteristic is the faint, brownish image of a front and back view of a naked man with his hands folded across his groin. The two views are aligned along the midplane of the body and point in opposite directions. The front and back views of the head nearly meet at the middle of the cloth.

The image in faint straw-yellow colour on the crown of the cloth fibres appears to be of a man with a beard, moustache, and shoulder-length hair parted in the middle. He is muscular and tall (various experts have measured him as from ). Reddish-brown stains are found on the cloth, correlating, according to proponents, with the wounds in the Biblical description of the crucifixion of Jesus.

In May 1898, Italian photographer Secondo Pia was allowed to photograph the shroud. He took the first photograph of the shroud on 28 May 1898.  In 1931, another photographer, Giuseppe Enrie, photographed the shroud and obtained results similar to Pia's. In 1978, ultraviolet photographs were taken of the shroud.

The shroud was damaged in a fire in 1532 in the chapel in Chambery, France. There are some burn holes and scorched areas down both sides of the linen, caused by contact with molten silver during the fire that burned through it in places while it was folded.  Fourteen large triangular patches and eight smaller ones were sewn onto the cloth by Poor Clare nuns to repair the damage.

History

There are no definite historical records concerning the particular shroud currently at Turin Cathedral prior to the 14th century. A burial cloth, which some historians maintain was the Shroud, was owned by the Byzantine emperors but disappeared during the Sack of Constantinople in 1204. Although there are numerous reports of Jesus's burial shroud, or an image of his head, of unknown origin, being venerated in various locations before the 14th century, there is no historical evidence that these refer to the shroud currently at Turin Cathedral.

Historical records seem to indicate that a shroud bearing the image of a crucified man appeared in the small town of Lirey, in north-central France, around the years 1353 to 1357.  It was owned by a French knight, Geoffroi de Charny, who died at the Battle of Poitiers in 1356.  In 1390, the Bishop of Troyes, Pierre d'Arcis, who had jurisdiction over the church in Lirey, wrote a lengthy memorandum to Antipope Clement VII (recognized as Pope by the Church in France during the Western Schism), declaring that the shroud was a forgery and that a previous Bishop of Troyes, Henri de Poitiers, had identified the artist who had made it.

The history of the shroud from the 15th century is well recorded. In 1453, Margaret de Charny deeded the Shroud to the House of Savoy. In 1532, the shroud suffered damage from a fire in a chapel of Chambéry, capital of the Savoy region, where it was stored. A drop of molten silver from the reliquary produced a symmetrically placed mark through the layers of the folded cloth. Poor Clare Nuns attempted to repair this damage with patches. In 1578, Emmanuel Philibert, Duke of Savoy ordered the cloth to be brought from Chambéry to Turin and it has remained at Turin ever since.

Since the 17th century, the shroud has been displayed in the chapel built for that purpose by Guarino Guarini. Repairs were made to the shroud in 1694 by Sebastian Valfrè to improve the repairs of the Poor Clare nuns. Further repairs were made in 1868 by Princess Maria Clotilde of Savoy. The shroud remained the property of the House of Savoy until 1983, when it was given to the Holy See by Umberto II of Italy.

The shroud was first photographed in 1898, during a public exhibition.

A fire, possibly caused by arson, threatened the shroud on 11 April 1997. In 2002, the Holy See had the shroud restored. The cloth backing and thirty patches were removed, making it possible to photograph and scan the reverse side of the cloth, which had been hidden from view. A faint part-image of the body was found on the back of the shroud in 2004.

The Shroud was placed back on public display (the 18th time in its history) in Turin from 10 April to 23 May 2010; and according to Church officials, more than 2 million visitors came to see it.

On Holy Saturday (30 March) 2013, images of the shroud were streamed on various websites as well as on television for the first time in 40 years. Roberto Gottardo of the diocese of Turin stated that for the first time they had released high definition images of the shroud that can be used on tablet computers and can be magnified to show details not visible to the naked eye. As this rare exposition took place, Pope Francis issued a carefully worded statement which urged the faithful to contemplate the shroud with awe but, like his predecessors, he "stopped firmly short of asserting its authenticity".

The shroud was again placed on display in the cathedral in Turin from 19 April 2015 until 24 June 2015. There was no charge to view it, but an appointment was required.

Conservation

The shroud has undergone several restorations and several steps have been taken to preserve it to avoid further damage and contamination. It is kept under laminated bulletproof glass in an airtight case. The temperature- and humidity-controlled case is filled with argon (99.5%) and oxygen (0.5%) to prevent chemical changes. The shroud itself is kept on an aluminum support sliding on runners and stored flat within the case.

Religious views

The Gospels of Matthew, Mark, and Luke state that Joseph of Arimathea wrapped the body of Jesus in a piece of linen cloth and placed it in a new tomb. The Gospel of John says he used strips of linen.

After the resurrection, the Gospel of John states: "Simon Peter came along behind him and went straight into the tomb. He saw the strips of linen lying there, as well as the cloth that had been wrapped around Jesus' head. The cloth was still lying in its place, separate from the linen."
The Gospel of Luke states: "Peter, however, got up and ran to the tomb. Bending over, he saw the strips of linen lying by themselves."

In 1543, John Calvin, in his book Treatise on Relics, explained the reason why the Shroud cannot be genuine:

Although pieces said to be of burial cloths of Jesus are held by at least four churches in France and three in Italy, none has gathered as much religious following as the Shroud of Turin. The religious beliefs and practices associated with the shroud predate historical and scientific discussions and have continued in the 21st century, although the Catholic Church has never passed judgment on its authenticity. An example is the Holy Face Medal bearing the image from the shroud, worn by some Catholics. Indeed, the Shroud of Turin is respected by Christians of several traditions, including Baptists, Catholics, Lutherans, Methodists, Orthodox, Pentecostals, and Presbyterians. Several Lutheran parishes have hosted replicas of the Shroud of Turin, for didactic and devotional purposes.

Devotions
Although the shroud image is currently associated with Catholic devotions to the Holy Face of Jesus, the devotions themselves predate Secondo Pia's 1898 photograph. Such devotions had been established in 1844 by the Carmelite nun Marie of St Peter (based on "pre-crucifixion" images associated with the Veil of Veronica) and promoted by Leo Dupont, also called the Apostle of the Holy Face. In 1851 Dupont formed the "Archconfraternity of the Holy Face" in Tours, France, well before Secondo Pia took the photograph of the shroud.

Miraculous image

The religious concept of the miraculous acheiropoieton (Greek: made without hands) has a long history in Christianity, going back to at least the 6th century.  Among the most prominent portable early acheiropoieta are the Image of Camuliana and the Mandylion or Image of Edessa, both painted icons of Christ held in the Byzantine Empire and now generally regarded as lost or destroyed, as is the Hodegetria image of the Virgin Mary. Other early images in Italy, all heavily and unfortunately restored, that have been revered as acheiropoieta now have relatively little following, as attention has focused on the Shroud.

Vatican position
In 1389, the bishop of Troyes sent a memorial to Antipope Clement VII, declaring that the cloth had been "artificially painted in an ingenious way" and that "it was also proved by the artist who had painted it that it was made by human work, not miraculously produced". In 1390, Clement VII consequently issued four papal bulls, with which he allowed the exposition, but ordered to "say aloud, to put an end to all fraud, that the aforementioned representation is not the true Shroud of Our Lord Jesus Christ, but a painting or panel made to represent or imitate the Shroud ". However, in 1506, Pope Julius II reversed this position and declared the Shroud to be authentic and authorized the public veneration of it with its own mass and office.

The Vatican newspaper L'Osservatore Romano covered the story of Secondo Pia's photograph of 28 May 1898 in its edition of 15 June 1898, but it did so with no comment and thereafter Church officials generally refrained from officially commenting on the photograph for almost half a century.

The first official modern association between the image on the Shroud and the Catholic Church was made in 1940 based on the formal request by Sister Maria Pierina De Micheli to the curia in Milan to obtain authorization to produce a medal with the image. The authorization was granted and the first medal with the image was offered to Pope Pius XII who approved the medal. The image was then used on what became known as the Holy Face Medal worn by many Catholics, initially as a means of protection during World War II. In 1958 Pope Pius XII approved of the image in association with the devotion to the Holy Face of Jesus, and declared its feast to be celebrated every year the day before Ash Wednesday. Following the approval by Pope Pius XII, Catholic devotions to the Holy Face of Jesus have been almost exclusively associated with the image on the shroud.

In 1936, Pope Pius XII called the Shroud a "holy thing perhaps like nothing else", and went on to approve of the devotion accorded to it as the Holy Face of Jesus.

In 1998, Pope John Paul II called the Shroud a "distinguished relic" and "a mirror of the Gospel". His successor, Pope Benedict XVI, called it an "icon written with the blood of a whipped man, crowned with thorns, crucified and pierced on his right side". In 2013, Pope Francis referred to it as an "icon of a man scourged and crucified".

Members of other Christian denominations, such as Anglicans and Methodists, have also shown devotion to the Shroud of Turin.

In 1983, the Shroud was given to the Holy See by the House of Savoy. However, as with all relics of this kind, the Roman Catholic Church made no pronouncements on its authenticity. As with other approved Catholic devotions, the matter has been left to the personal decision of the faithful, as long as the Church does not issue a future notification to the contrary. In the Church's view, whether the cloth is authentic or not has no bearing whatsoever on the validity of what Jesus taught or on the saving power of his death and resurrection.

Pope John Paul II stated in 1998 that: "Since it is not a matter of faith, the Church has no specific competence to pronounce on these questions. She entrusts to scientists the task of continuing to investigate, so that satisfactory answers may be found to the questions connected with this Sheet." Pope John Paul II showed himself to be deeply moved by the image of the Shroud and arranged for public showings in 1998 and 2000. In his address at the Turin Cathedral on Sunday 24 May 1998 (the occasion of the 100th year of Secondo Pia's 28 May 1898 photograph), he said: "The Shroud is an image of God's love as well as of human sin... The imprint left by the tortured body of the Crucified One, which attests to the tremendous human capacity for causing pain and death to one's fellow man, stands as an icon of the suffering of the innocent in every age."

On 30 March 2013, as part of the Easter celebrations, there was an exposition of the shroud in the Cathedral of Turin. Pope Francis recorded a video message for the occasion, in which he described the image on the shroud as "this Icon of a man", and stated that "the Man of the Shroud invites us to contemplate Jesus of Nazareth." In his carefully worded statement, Pope Francis urged the faithful to contemplate the shroud with awe, but "stopped firmly short of asserting its authenticity".

Pope Francis went on a pilgrimage to Turin on 21 June 2015, to pray before and venerate the Holy Shroud and honor St. John Bosco on the bicentenary of his birth.

Scientific analysis

Sindonology (from the Greek σινδών—sindon, the word used in the Gospel of Mark to describe the type of the burial cloth of Jesus) is the formal study of the Shroud. The Oxford English Dictionary cites the first use of this word in 1964: "The investigation ... assumed the stature of a separate discipline and was given a name, sindonology," but also identifies the use of "sindonological" in 1950 and "sindonologist" in 1953.

Secondo Pia's 1898 photographs of the shroud allowed the scientific community to begin to study it. A variety of scientific theories regarding the shroud have since been proposed, based on disciplines ranging from chemistry to biology and medical forensics to optical image analysis. The scientific approaches to the study of the Shroud fall into three groups: material analysis (both chemical and historical), biology and medical forensics and image analysis.

Early studies
The first direct examination of the shroud by a scientific team was undertaken in 1969–1973 in order to advise on preservation of the shroud and determine specific testing methods. This led to the appointment of an 11-member Turin Commission to advise on the preservation of the relic and on specific testing. Five of the commission members were scientists, and preliminary studies of samples of the fabric were conducted in 1973.

In 1976, physicist John P. Jackson, thermodynamicist Eric Jumper and photographer William Mottern used image analysis technologies developed in aerospace science for analyzing the images of the Shroud. In 1977, these three scientists and over thirty other experts in various fields formed the Shroud of Turin Research Project. In 1978, this group, often called STURP, was given direct access to the Shroud.

Also in 1978, independently from the STURP research, Giovanni Tamburelli obtained at CSELT a 3D-elaboration from the Shroud with higher resolution than Jumper and Mottern. A second result of Tamburelli was the electronic removal from the image of the blood that apparently covers the face.

Tests for pigments
In October 1978, a team of scientists affiliated with STURP took 32 samples from the surface of the Shroud, using adhesive tape.  Of those samples, 18 were taken from areas of the Shroud that showed a body or blood image, while 14 were taken from non-image areas.  The chemical microscopist Walter McCrone, a leading expert in the forensic authentication of historical documents and works of art, examined the tapes using polarized light microscopy and other physical and chemical techniques.  McCrone concluded that the Shroud's body image had been painted with a dilute pigment of red ochre (a form of iron oxide) in a collagen tempera (i.e., gelatin) medium, using a technique similar to the grisaille employed in the 14th century by Simone Martini and other European artists.  McCrone also found that the "bloodstains" in the image had been highlighted with vermilion (a bright red pigment made from mercury sulfide), also in a collagen tempera medium.  McCrone reported that no actual blood was present in the samples taken from the Shroud.

Other members of STURP rejected McCrone's conclusions and concluded, based on their own examination of the Shroud and the tape samples, that the image on the Shroud could not be explained by the presence of pigments.  Mark Anderson, who was working for McCrone, analyzed the Shroud samples. In his book Ray Rogers states that Anderson, who was McCrone's Raman microscopy expert, concluded that the samples acted as organic material when he subjected them to the laser.  McCrone resigned from STURP in June 1980, after giving back all of the tape samples in his possession to Ray Rogers.

John Heller and Alan Adler examined the same samples and agreed with McCrone's result that the cloth contains iron oxide. However, they argued that the exceptional purity of the chemical and comparisons with other ancient textiles showed that, while retting flax absorbs iron selectively, the iron itself was not the source of the image on the shroud.

After his analysis of the Shroud was first published in 1980, McCrone continued to argue in journal articles, public lectures, and in the book Judgment Day for the Shroud of Turin (which appeared in 1996), that the Shroud had been painted in the 14th century and that it showed no traces of actual blood.  He also argued that the members of STURP lacked relevant expertise in the chemical microanalysis of historical artworks and that their non-detection of pigment in the Shroud's image was "consistent with the sensitivity of the instruments and techniques they used."   For his work on the Shroud, McCrone was awarded the American Chemical Society's National Award in Analytical Chemistry in 2000.

Radiocarbon dating

After years of discussion, the Holy See permitted radiocarbon dating on portions of a swatch taken from a corner of the shroud. Independent tests in 1988 at the University of Oxford, the University of Arizona, and the Swiss Federal Institute of Technology concluded with 95% confidence that the shroud material dated to 1260–1390 AD. This 13th- to 14th-century dating is much too recent for the shroud to have been associated with Jesus. The dating does on the other hand match the first appearance of the shroud in church history. This dating is also slightly more recent than that estimated by art historian W. S. A. Dale, who postulated on artistic grounds that the shroud is an 11th-century icon made for use in worship services.

Some proponents for the authenticity of the shroud have attempted to discount the radiocarbon dating result by claiming that the sample may represent a medieval "invisible" repair fragment rather than the image-bearing cloth. However, all of the hypotheses used to challenge the radiocarbon dating have been scientifically refuted, including the medieval repair hypothesis, the bio-contamination hypothesis and the carbon monoxide hypothesis.

In recent years, the radiocarbon dating data have been repeatedly statistically analysed, in attempts to draw some conclusions about the reliability of the C14 dating from studying the data rather than studying the shroud itself. The studies have all concluded that the data lack homogeneity, which might be due to unidentified abnormalities in the fabric tested, or to differences in the pre-testing cleaning processes used by the different laboratories. The most recent analysis (2020) concluded that the stated date range needs to be adjusted by up to 88 years in order to properly meet the requirement of "95% confidence".

Material historical analysis

Historical fabrics

In 1998, shroud researcher Joe Nickell wrote that no examples of herringbone weave are known from the time of Jesus. The few samples of burial cloths that are known from the era are made using plain weave. In 2000, fragments of a burial shroud from the 1st century were discovered in a tomb near Jerusalem, believed to have belonged to a Jewish high priest or member of the aristocracy. Based on this discovery, the researchers concluded that the Turin Shroud did not originate from Jesus-era Jerusalem.

Biological and medical forensics

Blood stains
There are several reddish stains on the shroud suggesting blood, but it is uncertain whether these stains were produced at the same time as the image, or afterwards. McCrone (see painting hypothesis) showed that these contain iron oxide, and theorised that its presence was likely due to simple pigment materials used in medieval times.

Skeptics cite forensic blood tests whose results dispute the authenticity of the Shroud, and point to the possibility that the blood could belong to a person who handled the shroud, and that the apparent blood flows on the shroud are unrealistically neat.

Flowers and pollen

A study published in 2011 by Salvatore Lorusso of the University of Bologna and others subjected two photographs of the shroud to detailed modern digital image processing, one of them being a reproduction of the photographic negative taken by Giuseppe Enrie in 1931. They did not find any images of flowers or coins or anything else on either image.

In 2015, Italian researchers Barcaccia et al. published a new study in Scientific Reports. They examined the human and non-human DNA found when the shroud and its backing cloth were vacuumed in 1977 and 1988. They found traces of 19 different plant taxa, including plants native to Mediterranean countries, Central Europe, North Africa, the Middle East, Eastern Asia (China) and the Americas. Of the human mtDNA, sequences were found belonging to haplogroups that are typical of various ethnicities and geographic regions, including Europe, North and East Africa, the Middle East and India. A few non-plant and non-human sequences were also detected, including various birds and one ascribable to a marine worm common in the Northern Pacific Ocean, next to Canada. After sequencing some DNA of pollen and dust found on the shroud, they confirmed that many people from many different places came in contact with the shroud. According to the scientists, "such diversity does not exclude a Medieval origin in Europe but it would be also compatible with the historic path followed by the Turin Shroud during its presumed journey from the Near East. Furthermore, the results raise the possibility of an Indian manufacture of the linen cloth."

Anatomical forensics

A number of studies on the anatomical consistency of the image on the shroud and the nature of the wounds on it have been performed, following the initial study by Yves Delage in 1902. While Delage declared the image anatomically flawless, others have presented arguments to support both authenticity and forgery.

The analysis of a crucified Roman, discovered near Venice in 2007, shows heel wounds that are consistent with those found on Jehohanan but which are not consistent with wounds depicted on the shroud. Also, neither of the crucifixion victims known to archaeology shows evidence of wrist wounds.

Joe Nickell in 1983, and Gregory S. Paul in 2010, separately state that the proportions of the image are not realistic. Paul stated that the face and proportions of the shroud image are impossible, that the figure cannot represent that of an actual person and that the posture was inconsistent. They argued that the forehead on the shroud is too small; and that the arms are too long and of different lengths and that the distance from the eyebrows to the top of the head is non-representative. They concluded that the features can be explained if the shroud is a work of a Gothic artist.

In 2018, an experimental Bloodstain Pattern Analysis (BPA) was performed to study the behaviour of blood flows from the wounds of a crucified person, and to compare this to the evidence on the Turin Shroud. The comparison between different tests demonstrated that the blood patterns on the forearms and on the back of the hand are not connected, and would have had to occur at different times, as a result of a very specific sequence of movements. In addition, the rivulets on the front of the image are not consistent with the lines on the lumbar area, even supposing there might have been different episodes of bleeding at different times. These inconsistencies suggest that the Turin linen was an artistic or "didactic" representation, rather than an authentic burial shroud.

As Raymond E. Brown noticed, it is impossible for a corpse lying prostrate to cover his own genitals.

Image and text analysis

Image analysis
Both art-historical digital image processing and analog techniques have been applied to the shroud images.

In 1976, scientists used NASA imaging equipment to analyse a photograph of the shroud image and decoded the shroud image into a 3-dimensional image.
Optical physicist and former STURP member John Dee German has noted that it is not difficult to make a photograph which has 3D qualities. If the object being photographed is lit from the front, and a non-reflective "fog" of some sort exists between the camera and the object, then less light will reach and reflect back from the portions of the object that are farther from the lens, thus creating a contrast which is dependent on distance.

The image could be compared to oshiguma, the making of face-prints as an artform, in Japan. Furthermore, the subject's physical appearance corresponds to Byzantine iconography.

The Shroud cloth is composed of threads of a nominal diameter of 0.15 mm, woven with fibers of linen with a diameter of about 10-20 µm.

The Shroud image is a faint   and superficial image caused by a translucent and discontinuous yellow discoloration of the fibers.  In the points where the image is present, the discoloration affects only 2 or 3 fibers on the topmost part of the threads of the cloth.  In each fiber, the yellow discoloration penetrates only for 200 nm in the external cell layer.

A fiber is not necessarily colored for all its length, but, in the parts where it is, it has the property of being colored all around its cylindrical surface.

Under the crossing threads of the weave, the image is not present.

The discoloration seems caused by a kind of dehydrative oxidation process, which has discolored and chemically altered the surfaces of certain surface fibrils.

The image of the Shroud is an areal density image, in the sense that the levels of darkness are not given by variations of the color, which instead is approximately constant all over the image, but by a variation of the number of yellowed fibers per unit area. Therefore, it can be considered a halftone image.  Furthermore, there is no difference in terms of distribution of fiber coloration and maximum densities between the front and the rear of the image.

While the blood images could have come from a contact mechanism, the body image could not. The mapping between body-only image densities and expected cloth–body distances is not consistent with the image having been formed by direct contact with a body, as it is present even when it does not seem possible for the cloth to be in contact with the body.

Hypotheses on image origin

Painting 

According to Walter McCrone, the technique used for producing the image on the shroud could well be the same as a medieval grisaille method described in Sir Charles Lock Eastlake's Methods and Materials of Painting of the Great Schools and Masters (1847).  Eastlake describes in the chapter "Practice of Painting Generally During the XIVth Century" a special technique of painting on linen using tempera paint, which produces images with unusual transparent features that McCrone compares to the image on the shroud.  McCrone also argued that the current image on the shroud may be fainter than the original painting, due to the rubbing off of the ochre pigment from the tops of the exposed linen fibers over the course of several centuries of handling and exhibition of the fabric.

Acid pigmentation 
In 2009, Luigi Garlaschelli, professor of organic chemistry at the University of Pavia, stated that he had made a full size reproduction of the Shroud of Turin using only medieval technologies. Garlaschelli placed a linen sheet over a volunteer and then rubbed it with an acidic pigment. The shroud was then aged in an oven before being washed to remove the pigment. He then added blood stains, scorches and water stains to replicate the original. Giulio Fanti, professor of mechanical and thermic measurements at the University of Padua, commented that "the technique itself seems unable to produce an image having the most critical Turin Shroud image characteristics".

Garlaschelli's reproduction was shown in a 2010 National Geographic documentary. Garlaschelli's technique included the bas-relief approach (described below) but only for the image of the face. The resultant image was visibly similar to the Turin Shroud, though lacking the uniformity and detail of the original.

Medieval photography

The art historian Nicholas Allen has proposed that the image on the shroud could have been formed as early as the 13th century using techniques described in the 1011 Book of Optics.
However, according to Mike Ware, a chemist and expert on the history of photography, Allen's proposal "encounters serious obstacles with regard to the technical history of the lens. Such claimants tend to draw upon the wisdom of hindsight to project a distorted historical perspective, wherein their cases rest upon a particular concatenation of procedures which is exceedingly improbable; and their 'proofs' amount only to demonstrating (none too faithfully) that it was not totally impossible." Among other difficulties, Allen's hypothesized process would have required that the subject (a corpse) be exposed in the sunlight for months.

Dust-transfer technique
Scientists Emily Craig and Randall Bresee have attempted to recreate the likenesses of the shroud through the dust-transfer technique, which could have been done by medieval arts. They first did a carbon-dust drawing of a Jesus-like face (using collagen dust) on a newsprint made from wood pulp (which is similar to 13th- and 14th-century paper). They next placed the drawing on a table and covered it with a piece of linen. They then pressed the linen against the newsprint by firmly rubbing with the flat side of a wooden spoon. By doing this they managed to create a reddish-brown image with a lifelike positive likeness of a person, a three-dimensional image and no sign of brush strokes.

Bas-relief
In 1978, Joe Nickell noted that the Shroud image had a three-dimensional quality and thought its creation may have involved a sculpture of some type. He advanced the hypothesis that a medieval rubbing technique was used to explain the image, and set out to demonstrate this. He noted that while wrapping a cloth around a sculpture with normal contours would result in a distorted image, Nickell believed that wrapping a cloth over a bas-relief might result in an image like the one seen on the shroud, as it would eliminate wraparound distortions. For his demonstration, Nickell wrapped a wet cloth around a bas-relief sculpture and allowed it to dry. He then applied powdered pigment rather than wet paint (to prevent it soaking into the threads). The pigment was applied with a dauber, similar to making a rubbing from a gravestone. The result was an image with dark regions and light regions convincingly arranged. In a photo essay in Popular Photography magazine, Nickell demonstrated this technique step-by-step. Other researchers later replicated this process.

In 2005, researcher Jacques di Costanzo constructed a bas-relief of a Jesus-like face and draped wet linen over it. After the linen dried, he dabbed it with a mixture of ferric oxide and gelatine. The result was an image similar to that of the face on the Shroud.

Instead of painting, it has been suggested that the bas-relief could also be heated and used to scorch an image onto the cloth. However researcher Thibault Heimburger performed some experiments with the scorching of linen, and found that a scorch mark is only produced by direct contact with the hot object—thus producing an all-or-nothing discoloration with no graduation of color as is found in the shroud.

Maillard reaction
The Maillard reaction is a form of non-enzymatic browning involving an amino acid and a reducing sugar. The cellulose fibers of the shroud are coated with a thin carbohydrate layer of starch fractions, various sugars, and other impurities. The potential source for amines required for the reaction is a decomposing body, and no signs of decomposition have been found on the Shroud. Rogers also notes that their tests revealed that there were no proteins or bodily fluids on the image areas. Also, the image resolution and the uniform coloration of the linen resolution seem to be incompatible with a mechanism involving diffusion.

Fringe theories

Images of coins, flowers and writing
Various people have claimed to have detected images of flowers on the shroud, as well as coins over the eyes of the face in the image, writing and other objects. However a study published in 2011 by Lorusso and others subjected two photographs of the shroud to detailed modern digital image processing, one of them being a reproduction of the photographic negative taken by Giuseppe Enrie in 1931. They did not find any images of flowers or coins or writing or any other additional objects on the shroud in either photograph, they noted that the faint images were "only visible by incrementing the photographic contrast", and they concluded that these signs may be linked to protuberances in the yarn, and possibly also to the alteration and influence of the texture of the Enrie photographic negative during its development in 1931. The use of coins to cover the eyes of the dead is not attested for 1st-century Palestine. The existence of the coin images is rejected by most scientists.

Pray Codex
An image in the medieval manuscript of the Pray Codex (c. 1192-1195) has generated a debate among some believers since 1978. Although the Pray Codex predates the Shroud of Turin, some of the assumed features of the drawing, including the four L-shaped holes on the coffin lid, have pointed some people towards a possible attempted representation of the linen cloth. However the image on the Pray Codex has crosses on what may be one side of the supposed shroud, an interlocking step pyramid pattern on the other, and no image of Jesus. Critics point out that it may not be a shroud at all, but rather a rectangular tombstone, as seen on other sacred images.  A crumpled cloth can be seen discarded on the coffin, and the text of the codex fails to mention any miraculous image on the codex shroud.

Radiation processes
Some proponents for the authenticity of the Shroud of Turin have argued that the image on the shroud was created by some form of radiation emission at the "moment of resurrection". However, STURP member Alan Adler has stated that this theory is not generally accepted as scientific, given that it runs counter to the laws of physics. Raymond Rogers also criticized the theory, saying: "It is clear that a corona discharge (plasma) in air will cause easily observable changes in a linen sample. No such effects can be observed in image fibers from the Shroud of Turin. Corona discharges and/or plasmas made no contribution to image formation."

See also 

 Depiction of Jesus
 Relics associated with Jesus
 Seamless robe

Notes

References

Further reading 
 Picknett, Lynn and Prince, Clive: The Turin Shroud: In Whose Image?, Harper-Collins, 1994 .
 Antonacci, Mark : The Resurrection of the Shroud, M. Evans & Co., New York 2000, 
 Whiting, Brendan,  The Shroud Story, Harbour Publishing, 2006, 
 Di Lazzaro, Paolo (ed.) : Proceedings of the International Workshop on the Scientific Approach to the Acheiropoietos Images, ENEA, 2010, .
 Olmi, Massimo, Indagine sulla croce di Cristo, Torino 2015 
 Jackson, John, The Shroud of Turin. A Critical Summary of Observations, Data, and Hypotheses, CMJ Marian Publishers, 2017,

External links 

 Sindone.org – official site of the custodians of the shroud in Turin
 Professor Creates 3D Image From Shroud
 The Shroud of Turin Website – Shroud of Turin Education and Research Association, Inc. website
 Turin Shroud Center of Colorado – research center of John Jackson, a leading member of the STURP team
 Good Science, Bad Science, and the Shroud of Turin – 2014 NYUAD Chemistry lecture on YouTube
 Unwrapping the Shroud – 2009 Discovery channel documentary on YouTube
 Shroud of Turin Evidence – 2008 BBC documentary on YouTube
 Barrie Schwortz interview – EWTN interview with photographer Barrie Shwortz on YouTube

 
Tourist attractions in Turin
Culture in Turin